Thomas Paul "Tompall" Glaser (September 3, 1933 – August 12, 2013) was an American outlaw country music artist.

Biography 
Glaser was born in Spalding, Nebraska, the son of Alice Harriet Marie (née Davis) and Louis Nicholas Glaser. He was raised on a farm.

In the 1950s, he recorded as a solo artist. He later formed a trio with brothers Chuck and Jim called Tompall & the Glaser Brothers.

Tompall and his brothers shared the bill with Patsy Cline at The Mint casino in Las Vegas, in November–December 1962.

Tompall Glaser's highest-charting solo single was Shel Silverstein's "Put Another Log on the Fire", which peaked at No. 21 on the Billboard Hot Country Singles (now Hot Country Songs) charts in 1975.

Tompall appeared with Willie Nelson, Waylon Jennings, and Jessi Colter on the album Wanted! The Outlaws. In the 1970s his Nashville recording studio, dubbed "Hillbilly Central," was considered the nerve center of the nascent Outlaw country movement. Glaser, Waylon Jennings and Willie Nelson were central figures in that movement.

Glaser died on August 12, 2013, in Nashville, Tennessee, at the age of 79, after a long illness. He was survived by his wife, June Johnson Glaser. His brother, Jim, died of a heart attack on April 6, 2019, at the age of 81. His brother, Chuck, died two months later on June 10, 2019, at the age of 83.

Solo discography

Albums

Singles

See also 
 "Streets of Baltimore"
 Tompall & the Glaser Brothers
 Jim Glaser

References

External links 

1933 births
2013 deaths
American country singer-songwriters
American male singer-songwriters
People from Spalding, Nebraska
Country musicians from Nebraska
Singer-songwriters from Nebraska